Walmar Castle was launched in 1836 as an East Indiaman. She made 16 voyages two India, and at least two to Australia with migrants, and was sold about 14 October 1855. New owners then traded with China. She was last listed in 1867 with data unchanged since 1857.

Career
Walmer Castle first appeared in Lloyd's Register (LR), but with minimal information. 

Walmer Castle, John Thorne, master, sailed from the Downs on 5 September 1846 and arrived at Port Jackson on 23 December 1846. She was carrying eleven cabin passengers, three passengers in intermediate, and ten passenger in steerage.

Walmer Castle sailed from Plymouth on 12 September 1848 and arrived at Sydney on 30 December 1848. She was under the command of Joseph Thorne, and had Dr John Neill Waugh as Surgeon-Superintendent. She had a crew of 50, ten passengers in cabin accommodation and 301 government=sponsored emigrants in steerage. These included 57 married couples, 53 single men, 43 single men, 49 boys and 28 girls from 1-14 years of age, 11 male and three female infants. Three female infants died as a consequence of non-contagious infant diseases; one crewman died on 15 September 1848.

On 12 October 1855. Walmer Castle sailed from Spithead for the Thames. Green & Co. sold her a few days later.

Fate
Walmer Castle was last listed in 1867 with data unchanged since 1857.

Citations

1836 ships
Age of Sail merchant ships of England
Migrant ships to Australia